Philipp Marx (born 3 February 1982) is a German professional tennis player. Marx competes on the ATP Challenger Tour and the ATP World Tour, both in singles and doubles. He reached his highest ATP singles ranking, No. 300, on April 3, 2006, and his highest ATP doubles ranking, No. 53, on 27 September 2010.

ATP career finals

Doubles: 2 (2 runners-up)

Futures and Challenger finals: 69 (29–40)

Singles: 6 (2–4)

Doubles: 63 (27–36)

Doubles performance timeline

References

External links

 
 

1982 births
Living people
German male tennis players
People from Marburg-Biedenkopf
Sportspeople from Giessen (region)
Tennis people from Hesse
21st-century German people